Sophie Fasold (born 2 January 1994) is a German/American handball player who plays for VfL Oldenburg in Germany. She has also played Handball at the Pan American Games for the American team. For a time she lived in Copperas Cove, Texas with her grandparents.

Individual Awards and recognitions
2017 Nor.Ca. Women's Handball Championship: All Star Team Goalkeeper
2021 Nor.Ca. Women's Handball Championship: All Star Team Goalkeeper

References  

Handball players at the 2011 Pan American Games
1994 births
Living people
German female handball players
American female handball players
Handball players at the 2019 Pan American Games
Pan American Games competitors for the United States
21st-century American women